Mark Talajic (born 2 July 1969) is an Australian former association football player.

Club career
Talajic made his debut for Melbourne Croatia at just 16 years of age as a product of the youth system and went on to establish himself as a key player over the course of several seasons. He briefly played for Canberra Metros before returning to his former club, now named Melbourne Knights FC. In 2003 as a part of the club's 50th Anniversary celebrations, Talajic was named in the club's Team of the Century nominees.

International career
Talajic represented Australia at both junior and senior level.

In 1985, he represented Australia at the FIFA U-16 World Championship where Australia made it through to the quarter final stage.

He also participated in the qualifiers for the 1987 FIFA World Youth Championship although failed to make the final team.

Talajic only made one appearance for Australia in 1992 against Indonesia as a part of the Indonesian Independence Cup.

References

External links 
 Aussie Footballers Tabain to Tathem

1969 births
Australian soccer players
Australia international soccer players
Living people
Association football midfielders